Aceruta (possibly from Aymara asiru snail, uta house,  "snail" or -ta a suffix, "from the snail") is a mountain in the Andes of Peru, about  high. It is situated in the Arequipa Region, Castilla Province, Chachas District. It lies north-west of the mountain Huayta and north-east of the mountain Huañacagua.

See also 
 Chuañuma

References

Mountains of Peru
Mountains of Arequipa Region